Star Names: Their Lore and Meaning is an 1899 book by Richard Hinckley Allen that discusses the names of stars, constellations, and their histories.

Background and authorship
Richard Hinckley Allen (1838, Buffalo, New York – 1908, Northampton, Massachusetts) was a gifted polymath and amateur naturalist; his wide range of interests caused his friends to nickname him "the walking encyclopedia." His youthful ambition to pursue astronomy was thwarted by poor eyesight, and he became a moderately successful businessman instead. He continued in scientific pursuits as a hobby for the rest of his life.

Content
First published in 1899 as Star-Names and Their Meanings, this work collected the origins of the names of stars and constellations from a panoply of sources, some primary but most secondary; also telling briefly the various myths and folklore connected with stars in the Greco-Roman tradition; as well as in the Arabic, Babylonian, Indian and Chinese traditions, for which, however, some modern criticism having taken it to task, claiming it to be largely superseded.

The book also provides some cursory details about astronomy at the knowledge level of the end of the 19th century. Similarly, astrology and its history are dealt with briefly in the introduction, and some other basic astrological references are scattered throughout the book, although downplayed.

Reception
Frederik Pohl in 1965 called Star Names "a fine book (but hardly 'hammock reading')". It was criticized by Paul Kunitzsch and Gary D. Thompson for using obsolete sources, and thereby being unreliable on star names and their derivation. Thompson maintains that the discussion on star names is especially unreliable as regards to Arabic star names, and otherwise also to Mesopotamian, and Egyptian constellations and star names. The book is mostly accurate in its explanations of Greek and Latin star names, although it contains minor historical errors and overestimates the age of some Greek temples.

Further reading
There is no direct modern equivalent, although Ian Ridpath deals with traditional Greek and Roman constellation mythology, while Short Guide to Modern Star Names by Paul Kunitzsch and Tim Smart (Otto Harrassowitz, 1986) is an authoritative source on the origin of star names.

See also
History of the constellations

References

External links
 Allen's Star Names at LacusCurtius

1899 books
19th-century history books
History books about science
History of astronomy
Astronomy books